UrduPoint is an Urdu-language web portal of Pakistan. Launched on August 14, 2000, it is the 6th most visited website in Pakistan and its global rank is 1045.
UrduPoint is also partner of digital media company Ziff Davis, a division of J2 Global, to launch Mashable Pakistan. This is dual-language, Urdu and English edition of Mashable. UrduPoint is accessible as a free website as a part of Internet.org (now freebasics.com) launched by Facebook in Pakistan.
UrduPoint has become the digital media partner of Multan Sultans in PSL 4. UrduPoint is also running a YouTube channel more than 7 million active subscribers.

References

External links
 Urdupoint

Web portals
Urdu-language websites
Pakistani websites